Jak se Franta naučil bát ("How Frank Met With Fear") is a 1959 Czechoslovak film. The film stars Josef Kemr and features Jana Andrsová.

References

External links
 

1959 films
Czechoslovak short films
1950s Czech-language films
Czech short films
Films based on works by Božena Němcová
Films based on fairy tales
1950s Czech films